"Please Don't Let Me Love You" is a song by written by Ralph Jones and first recorded by George Morgan, who had a #4 country hit with it in 1949.

Hank Williams Version
In 1955, MGM acquired the Johnnie Fair Syrup shows.  Between January and May 1949, Williams had pre-recorded early morning radio shows for Johnnie Fair, and MGM issued several songs from the surviving acetates as singles to satisfy the unyielding demand for product by the late country singer, who was quickly becoming a mythic figure in country music.  It was released as the B-side to "Faded Love and Winter Roses" and became his last solo hit, peaking at #9 on the country singles chart.

References

Hank Williams songs